Rupa Goswami (1489–1564) was a devotional teacher (guru), poet, and philosopher of the Gaudiya Vaishnava tradition. With his brother Sanatana Goswami, he is considered the most senior of the Six Goswamis of Vrindavan associated with Caitanya Mahaprabhu, a hidden avatar (incarnation) of Krishna in Kali Yuga.

Biography

Genealogy

His family lineage can be traced to Indian State of Karnataka and Naihati in the district of North 24 Parganas in present-day West Bengal, India. The former generations according to Bhakti-ratnakara:

Sarvajna Jagatguru was a famous brahmana, great scholar in all Vedas, respected Yajur-vedi of the Baradvaja caste, and king of Karnataka in South India, adored by all other contemporary kings. Sarvajna's son, Aniruddha, was spirited, famous, a proficient scholar of the Vedas, and a favorite of the reigning kings at the time. Aniruddha's sons, Rupesvara (eldest) and Harihara, were well respected due to their virtuous qualities. Rupesvara was famed as a scholar of the scriptures, while Harihara became a master in the art and science of weapons. Both brothers inherited the administration of the state after their father died, but Harihara soon snatched all the power, causing Rupesvara and his wife to travel to Paulastha-desa, where Sikharesvara befriended him and convinced him to settle there.

Rupesvara's son, Padmanabha, was a genius and easily learned the four Vedas making him famous. He had impeccable character and was genuinely absorbed in love of Lord Jagannatha. He left Sikharabhumi and settled on the bank of the Ganges in the village Navahatta (present-day Naihati, West Bengal, India), where he had eighteen daughters and five sons. His five sons were Purusottama (eldest), Jagannatha, Narayana, Murari, and Mukunda (youngest), where Purusottama and Mukunda were the best in experience and character. Mukunda's son, Kumara, was a great brahmana and highly virtuous. He privately engaged in oblations and purificatory penances. Becoming very disturbed by family difficulties, he left the village Navahatta with his followers and settled in the village Bakla Chandradvipa in East Bengal (now Bangladesh). He built a house in the village Fateyabad in Jessore for the convenience of communications with devotees and traveling Vaishnavas.

Among Kumara's many sons, Sanatana (eldest), Rupa (middle), and Vallabha (youngest) were the life of the Vaishnava community and great devotees, all three becoming well known for their academic genius and devotion, and eventually settling in the village Ramakeli in Gauda (present-day Maldah, West Bengal). The brothers were greatly inspired by Chaitanya Mahaprabhu, who lived in Nadia (a district of present-day West Bengal, India) at the time. Sanatana and Rupa eventually resigned from their ministerial (royal) posts and retired to help Chaitanya in his mission, eventually relocating to Vrindavana. Vallabha, who was always happy in service, was initiated by Chaitanya and given the name Anupama, and was known for his stoicism and neutrality in his detachment from worldly affairs.

Alternatively, it is said that his ancestors migrated from Karnataka to Gauda and lived in the village Ramkeli, near Gauda for generations.

Birth
He was born in around 1489 CE. There seems to be some controversy amongst biographers about Rupa Goswami's birthplace. Some opine that he was born in Naihati, West Bengal while others believe that he was born in Bakla Chandradvipa or in Fateyabad Pargana, Jessore, East Bengal (now Bangladesh). Some biographers believe that he was born in Ramakeli in the district of Maldah, West Bengal.

Early life
According to Bhakti-ratnakara, Mukund's son, Kumaradeva, moved to Jessore from his birthplace Naihati. His sons were Santosha Bhatta (Rupa), Amara Bhatta (Sanatana) and Vallabha (Anupama). They were Telugu speaking Brahmins from Telang Desh from the Bhatt clan. On the demise of Kumaradeva, the three sons moved to Sakurma, near to the capital of Gaudadesa (present-day Maldah, West Bengal) where they continued their studies. They lived for the rest of their lives with their new monastic names and forsake their birth names.

The three brothers studied the Nyaya-sastras (treatise on justice) from the famous logician Sarvabhauma Bhattacarya and his brother Madhusudana Vidyavacaspati. They also studied Sanskrit, Arabic and Persian.

Due to their noble characters and academic proficiency, Rupa and his elder brother Sanatana were later forced into government service by the sultan of Bengal, Alauddin Husain Shah(1493–1519 CE) which led to their excommunication from Hindu society by the orthodox caste brahmanas of Gauda. Rupa became the Sultan's chief secretary (Dabir Khas), while Sanatana became the state revenue minister (Sakara Mallik).The Biographies of Sankaradeva of Assam too mention Rupa Goswami ; According to Sankar Charita (written by Ramacharan Thakur),Rupa gosvami and his wife met Sankardeva and accompanied him to Sitakunda.

First meeting with Chaitanya Mahaprabhu
Rupa and his brothers were residents of Ramakeli ( in present-day Maldah, West Bengal) and it was here, in 1514 CE, that they first met Chaitanya Mahaprabhu. The meeting changed their lives. After meeting them, Chaitanya gave them the names Rupa, Sanatana and Anupama. Sanatana advised Mahaprabhu,

Second meeting with Chaitanya Mahaprabhu
After visiting Vrindavana, Chaitanya stopped at the holy city of Prayaga (modern day Prayagaraj in Uttar Pradesh, India). It was here that Rupa and Anupama met him for the second time. At the Dasasvamedha Ghat (a famous bathing area on the banks of the River Ganges), Chaitanya imparted instructions to Rupa Goswami and explained all the intricacies of the doctrine of Gaudiya Vaishnavism. Rupa Goswami was specifically commanded by Chaitanya Mahaprabhu to carry out two tasks: to re-locate and preserve the lost holy places of Vrindavana, and to write and preach Gaudiya Vaisnava theology. He then sent Rupa Goswami to Vrindavana to carry out these orders.

Namo Mahavadanyaya Verse
During the time of the annual Rath Yatra festival, Rupa Goswami composed one mystical verse that Chaitanya Mahaprabhu requested him to read to his most intimate associates. Upon hearing this verse, all the assembled Vaishnavas praised Rupa Goswami for his outstanding composition that was filled with deep devotion for the Naths. Due to this, it was proclaimed that Rupa Goswami was the very embodiment of Chaitanya' Mahaprabhu's esoteric teachings of rasa (divine mellows). Because of this, Rupa Goswami is considered by the gaudiya vaisnavas to be the foremost follower of Chaitanya Mahaprabhu and those that strictly follow in his preceptoral line are known as Rupanugas (followers of Rupa).

Vrindavana
Rupa and Sanatana remained in Vrindavana for the remainder of their lives. Their mood of renunciation and devotion was exemplary. Rupa uncovered various holy places associated with the pastimes of Krishna and rediscovered the famous deity of Govindadeva, which was originally installed and worshipped by Krishna's great-grandson, Maharaja Vajranabha. Rupa and Sanatana were intimately connected with other Vaishnava saints in Vrindavana such as Lokanatha Goswami, Bhugarbha Goswami, Gopala Bhatta Goswami, Raghunatha Bhatta Goswami and Raghunatha Dasa Goswami.

Shortly after, they were also joined by their nephew Jiva Goswami who was given initiation by Rupa and personally trained by him in the philosophy of Gaudiya Vaishnavism.

Rupa Goswami departed from this world in 1564 CE and his samadhi (tomb) is located in the courtyard of the Radha-Damodara temple in Vrindavana.

In Gaudiya Vaishnava theology, Rupa Goswami is considered to be the incarnation of Rupa Manjuri, the foremost junior cowherd damsel who eternally serves Radha-Krishna under the guidance of Lalita.

Works

 Bhakti-rasāmṛta-sindhu (The Ocean of Nectar of Divine Love): Bhakti-rasāmṛta-sindhu can be considered to be one of the most important books in Gaudiya Vaishnavism. It elaborately describes gradations of bhakti from its lowest stage of sraddha (faith) up to its highest stage of maha-bhava (ultimate ecstasy in love of Godhead).
 Ujjvala-nilamani (The Sapphire of Divine Love): This work exclusively explains the conception of madhurya-rasa (divine conjugal love). Ujjvala-nilamani is considered to be a sequel to the Bhakti-rasamrta-sindhu.
 Laghu-bhagavatamrta (A Summary of Nectar about Godhead): It is a summary of Sanatana Goswami's book Brhat-bhagavatamrta. It begins by explaining the intrinsic nature of Krishna and his incarnations and subsequently deals with devotees of Krishna.
 Vidagdhamadhava (1524) & Lalitamadhava (1529): Rupa originally began to write these two dramas as one in 1516 but he completed them as two separate plays in Vikram Samvat 1581 (1524) and Saka era 1451 (1529) respectively. It is said that Rupa had a vision of Satyabhama, one of Krishna's queens in Dvaraka, who told him to divide the book into two separate dramas. Thus, Lalitamadhava deals with Krishna's pastimes in Dvaraka, and Vidagdhamadhava narrates Krishna's pastimes in Vrindavana.
 Stavamala (The Flower Garland of Prayers): This is a compilation of short works, some of which are often published as separate books.
 Danakelikaumudi (The Lotus-like Tax-collecting Pastimes) (1549): This Bhāṇikā (one-act play) was written in Saka era 1471 (1549) and narrates the danakeli (tax-collecting pastime) between Krishna and the Gopis of Vrindavana.
 Sri Radha-krsna-ganoddesa-dipika (A Lamp to See the Associates of Radha-Krsna) (1550): In this book, Rupa Goswami lists the associates of Radha and Krishna and describes their characteristics.
 Mathura-mahatmya (The Glories of Mathura): This book tells the glories of Mathura, in the form of a conversation between Varaha (the boar incarnation of Vishnu) and the Earth Goddess. Rupa Goswami explains various processes of devotional service by quoting statements from various Hindu scriptures and establishes that Mathura vanquishes all one's sinful reactions and awards piety and liberation.
 Uddhava-sandesa (News of Uddhava): In this work, Rupa Goswami narrates the story from the Bhagavata Purana of Krishna requesting his friend Uddhava to go to Vrindavana and pacify his friends and relations by reminding them of their pastimes with him.
 Hamsa-dutam (The Swan Messenger): This text tells the story how Lalita, the confident of Radha, sends a messenger in the form of a swan to Krishna in Dwaraka.
 Sri Krsna-janma-tithi-vidhi: This short work is a paddhati (manual on ritual worship) explaining the process of worshiping the deity of Krishna during the festival of Janmastami, the birthday of Krishna celebrated by Vaishnavas in August/September.
 Nataka-candrika (The Illuminating Moon of Dramatics) This book explains the rules of Gaudiya Vaisnava dramaturgy.
 Upadesamrta (The Nectar of Instruction): This short work contains eleven verses of instructions to aspirants on the path of devotion to Krishna. The Upadesamrta was originally a part of the Stavamala.

See also

 Hare Krishna
 Nityananda
 Vaishnava Theology
 Krishnology

References

Bibliography
 Tirtha, Swami B.B., Sri Caitanya and His Associates, 2002, Mandala Publishing, San Francisco. 
 Mahayogi, Swami B.V., Lives of the Saints, translated from Gaura Parsada Caritavali, unpublished work.
 Gaudiya Vaisnava Abhidhana (Bengali), Compiled by Haridasa Dasa, Haribol Kutir, Navadvipa, W. Bengal, 1957.
 Bhaktivedanta Swami Prabhupada, A.C., The Nectar of Devotion, 1970, Los Angeles: The Bhaktivedanta Book Trust. (A summary study of Bhakti-rasamrita-sindhu.)
 Swami, Dhanurdhara, Waves of Devotion, 2000, Bhagavat Books . (A study guide to The Nectar of Devotion.)

External links
 Rupa Goswami - Gaudiya History
 Upadesamrta (The Nectar of Instruction) – English translation by A. C. Bhaktivedanta Swami Prabhupada
 Nectar of Devotion – A summary study of Bhakti-rasamrita-sindhu by A. C. Bhaktivedanta Swami Prabhupada
Website On Krishna (krishna.com)
Online study of Rupa Goswami's Nectar of Devotion (bhakti-sastri.com)

1489 births
1564 deaths
Bengali Hindus
16th-century Bengalis
Gaudiya religious leaders
16th-century Indian philosophers
Devotees of Krishna
Bengali philosophers
16th-century Indian poets
People from Jessore District
Bengali Hindu saints
Bengal Sultanate officers
Poets from West Bengal